Kubara Dam is a gravity dam located in Fukuoka Prefecture in Japan. The dam is used for water supply. The catchment area of the dam is 16.9 km2. The dam impounds about 11  ha of land when full and can store 1600 thousand cubic meters of water. The construction of the dam was started on 1968 and completed in 1970.

References

Dams in Fukuoka Prefecture
1970 establishments in Japan